Charles Frederick Weber III is a former vocalist for the new wave band Devo in its earliest incarnation. Weber was a long-time prominent vocalist in Northeast Ohio cover bands The Chancellors, The Measles and Lace Wing, performing occasionally with Joe Walsh and the James Gang.

Weber played high-school football at Stow, Ohio, with NFL Hall of Famer and Miami Dolphins fullback Larry Csonka. A roommate of Devo co-founder Bob Lewis, Weber fronted the band in its initial performance in the Recital Hall during Kent State University's Creative Arts Festival in 1973.

References

American male singers
Singers from Ohio
Devo members
Living people
Year of birth missing (living people)